Katie Lane Thurston (born January 3, 1991) is an American television personality. She received national recognition as a contestant on season 25 of The Bachelor, and as the star of season 17 of The Bachelorette.

Early life and education

Thurston was raised in Lynnwood, Washington. She played the position of libero on the volleyball team at Lynnwood High School.

Television career

The Bachelor

Thurston first appeared as a contestant on Matt James' season of The Bachelor, where she finished in 11th place after being eliminated in week 6. During her time on The Bachelor, Thurston became a fan favorite after standing up to the bullying in the house.

The Bachelorette

Thurston and Michelle Young were announced as the leads of consecutive Bachelorette seasons on  March 15, 2021, during the Bachelor season 25 After the Final Rose special.

Personal life
Prior to appearing on The Bachelor, Thurston worked as a bank marketing manager in Renton, Washington, and had also gained a large following on the social media platform TikTok for her adult humor and sex positive videos. 

Thurston was engaged to Blake Moynes, whom she chose as the winner on the 17th season of The Bachelorette. They announced their mutual breakup in October 2021. The next month, she confirmed that she was in a relationship with John Hersey, a contestant on her season who was eliminated in week two. Thurston and Hersey broke up in June 2022.

References

External links

1991 births
Bachelor Nation contestants
Living people
People from Lynnwood, Washington
Sex-positive feminists